The Danish Women's Curling Championship is the national championship of women's curling in Denmark. It has been held annually since 1979.

List of champions

External links 
 DM Damer | Hvidovre Curling Club

See also
Danish Men's Curling Championship
Danish Mixed Curling Championship
Danish Mixed Doubles Curling Championship
Danish Junior Curling Championships
Danish Senior Curling Championships

Curling competitions in Denmark
Women's sports competitions in Denmark
National curling championships
Recurring sporting events established in 1979
1979 establishments in Denmark
Curling